"The Night of the Comet" is the second episode of the first season of The CW television series, The Vampire Diaries, and the series second episode overall. It originally aired on Thursday, September 17, 2009. The episode was written by Kevin Williamson and Julie Plec and directed by Marcos Siega. The title references the 1984 cult film Night of the Comet.

Plot
The episode starts with a couple camping in the woods, when the man gets out of the tent to get something from the car someone attacks him. The woman gets out and finds him dead, and she is killed soon after.

Vicki (Kayla Ewell) is still at the hospital after the vampire attack. Jeremy (Steven R. McQueen) visits her to see how she is doing, however she rebuffs him due to her feelings for Tyler (Michael Trevino) who has started showing more interest in her.

Jenna (Sara Canning) has a meeting at the school with Mr. Tanner (Benjamin Ayres) about Jeremy and he informs her that Jeremy is missing many classes because of the drug and alcohol abuse, as well as insulting her capability in raising two teenagers. Jenna tries later to talk some sense to Jeremy, but fails.

Elena (Nina Dobrev) and Matt (Zach Roerig) talk about Vicki and Matt tells her that Vicki said it was a vampire, but he does not believe her story. Stefan (Paul Wesley) who is sat close to them overhears their conversation and immediately worries that Vicki will expose vampires. He leaves for the hospital so he can compel her to forget and make her think that it was an animal who attacked her. Matt notices Stefan at the hospital and gets suspicious but Stefan narrowly escapes out of the window before Matt can catch him. Vicki says she was attacked by an animal but she still has nightmares where she sees Damon's (Ian Somerhalder) face.

Bonnie (Kat Graham) and Caroline (Candice Accola) discuss the recent events and Caroline says that she met a mysterious guy, who turns out to be Damon, the other day but she cannot find him anywhere. Elena walks in and Caroline convinces her to move forward and give Stefan a chance, something she decides to do right away and she leaves for Stefan's house.

Elena gets to the house, but Stefan is not there and she runs into Damon who introduces himself. He also seizes the opportunity to tell Elena about Stefan's ex, Katherine, and how she broke Stefan's heart. Stefan walks in and asks Elena to leave when Damon says that he will bring out the family album where there are also photos of Katherine.

Vicki is out of the hospital and when she gets into the bar-restaurant, she runs into Damon, who she vaguely remembers. Damon follows her and attacks her once again. When Jeremy cannot find her anywhere, they all start looking for her, including Stefan, who hears her screaming from afar. Damon keeps her at the roof of a building threatening to drop her.

Stefan rushes himself to the roof asking Damon to let Vicki go. Damon antagonizes Stefan by compelling Vicki into believing that Stefan attacked her, and tries forcing Stefan to kill her so she won't reveal everything. Stefan, however, refuses to do it saying that he does not care if Vicki exposes him and people kill him, which leads to Damon compelling her again into believing that an animal had attacked her.

Back at the restaurant, Vicki is safe again and Stefan asks Caroline and Bonnie about Elena. Bonnie writes down Elena's number to give it to him but the moment she touches him she senses that something bad happened to him. She asks him about it but she realizes she was being rude so she apologizes and leaves.

Stefan and Elena meet once again at the Salvatore house where he apologizes for his earlier behavior and she also tells him how scared she is to get out to the world. While they are talking, they have their first kiss.

In the meantime, Damon stalked Caroline to the parking lot where the two of them flirt and end up at Caroline's room. While they are about to have sex, Damon bites her.

Feature music 
In "The Night of the Comet" we can hear the songs:
 "Gravity" by Sara Bareilles
 "I Get Around" by Dragonette
 "I Am an Animal" by Neko Case
 "Heavy Cross" by The Gossip
 "Hang You from the Heavens" by The Dead Weather
 "Closer to Love" by Mat Kearney
 "Help I'm Alive" by Metric
 "Interloper" by Earlimart
 "Conductor" by We Were Promised Jetpacks
 "Mud" by Peaches

Reception

Ratings 
In its original American broadcast, "The Night of the Comet" was watched by 3.78 million; down by 1.13 from the previous episode.

Reviews 
"The Night of the Comet" received positive reviews.

Liana Aghajanian from Mania gave the episode a B rate saying that Damon steals the show "with his cocky attitude and intentions to ruin Stefan’s high school fantasy and budding relationship with Elena."

Zeba from Two Cents TV states that this episode is better than last week's: "Though still incredibly formulaic, this episode was certainly better than last week’s. The plot seems to be thickening and as usual Ian Somerhalder is incredibly enjoyable as the villain."

Cynthia from Every Joe gave a good review to the episode saying that it was "hot".

Lucia from Heroine TV also gave a good review to the episode stating: "I must admit that I’m really loving this show–I have re-watched both episodes multiple times, which is a rarity for me. I’m definitely in for the long haul."

References

External links

 The Vampire Diaries Episode Listings
 Recap from Official Website

2009 American television episodes
The Vampire Diaries (season 1) episodes
Television episodes directed by Marcos Siega